Dabakala Department is a department of Hambol Region in Vallée du Bandama District, Ivory Coast. In 2021, its population was 254,430 and its seat is the settlement of Dabakala. The sub-prefectures of the department are Bassawa, Boniérédougou, Dabakala, Foumbolo, Niéméné, Satama-Sokoro, Satama-Sokoura, Sokala-Sobara, Tendéné-Bambarasso, and Yaossédougou. It is the largest department of Ivory Coast by area.

History
Dabakala Department was created in 1974 as a split-off from Katiola Department.

In 1997, regions were introduced as new first-level subdivisions of Ivory Coast; as a result, all departments were converted into second-level subdivisions. Dabakala Department was included in Vallée du Bandama Region.

In 2011, districts were introduced as new first-level subdivisions of Ivory Coast. At the same time, regions were reorganised and became second-level subdivisions and all departments were converted into third-level subdivisions. At this time, Dabakala Department became part of Hambol Region in Vallée du Bandama District.

Notes

Departments of Hambol
1974 establishments in Ivory Coast
States and territories established in 1974